Joe Martel III also known as Tu (born October 14, 2000) He is the first known double amputee to play football in the state of Oklahoma without legs making Oklahoma history when he was 14 years old.

Biography 
At Beggs High School (Beggs, Oklahoma), 2015-2018 Martel was a three-sport athlete playing football, basketball, and Track & field.

Martel stands 4-foot 3-inches tall with his prosthetics off and with them on he is about 6 foot tall. Martel was born without shin bones a condition known as tibial hemimelia and portions of both legs were amputated when he was just 18 months old. 

Martel is now a popular Tiktoker posting comedy and inspirational videos on his account.

References 

 
 
 
 

Amputee football players
2000 births
Living people
Sportspeople from Oklahoma